Aleksandr Sergeyevich Kovalyov (born 21 February 1982) is a former Russian professional footballer.

Club career
He played 3 seasons in the Russian Football National League for FC Dynamo Bryansk, FC Spartak Nizhny Novgorod and FC SKA-Energiya Khabarovsk.

References

External links
 

1982 births
Living people
Russian footballers
Association football defenders
PFC CSKA Moscow players
FC Oryol players
FC Zhenis Astana players
FC Dynamo Bryansk players
FC SKA-Khabarovsk players
FC Dynamo Barnaul players
Kazakhstan Premier League players
Russian expatriate footballers
Expatriate footballers in Kazakhstan
Russian expatriate sportspeople in Kazakhstan
FC Olimp-Dolgoprudny players
FC Spartak Nizhny Novgorod players